The members of the House of Representatives of the Netherlands for People's Party for Freedom and Democracy is a list of all members of the House of Representatives who have been members of the People's Party for Freedom and Democracy faction.

List

Notes

References 

People's Party for Freedom and Democracy